So Random! is an American Disney Channel sketch comedy series that premiered on June 5, 2011. It was announced as an independent series after Demi Lovato left the parent series, Sonny with a Chance. The series features the actors who acted in Sonny with a Chance, besides Lovato: Tiffany Thornton, Sterling Knight, Brandon Mychal Smith, Doug Brochu, and Allisyn Ashley Arm along with other featured actors who recur in the series. The series premiere was watched by 4.1 million viewers.

On May 2, 2012, Tiffany Thornton indicated that the series had not been renewed for a second season and the show was cancelled after only 1 season.

Concept, production and premise
In Sonny with a Chance, Demi Lovato plays the title character, Sonny Monroe, a new member of the cast of the sketch comedy show So Random!, which is presented as a show-within-a-show. The series follows the experiences of Sonny, and the rest of the cast. The full length sketch comedy episode format was played within Sonny with a Chance during season 2 of the series for the Christmas and Halloween episodes. In November 2010, Lovato underwent treatment for "physical and emotional issues," and in April 2011, they confirmed that they would not be returning to Sonny with a Chance for its third season. They stated that returning to acting immediately wouldn't be healthy for their recovery.

Following Lovato's departure from the series, So Random! was introduced as its own series that focused more on comedy skits than Sonny with a Chance. Filming for the season began on January 30, 2011. Each episode features sketch comedy skits with the So Random! cast, as well as a musical performance by a guest star. Originally intended to be a third season of Sonny with a Chance, Disney began to describe the show as a separate series following Lovato's confirmed departure.

Each episode typically consists of five or six sketches. Though it is formatted as a sketch comedy series, So Random! retains the fictional universe style of the sitcom it spun off from, with the main cast members playing both the characters they originated on Sonny with a Chance, in addition to playing the characters appearing in each of the sketches. Such a reference to Sonny with a Chance was made when Grady kept hitting the applause button while trying to open a pickle jar, and Zora goes offstage to tell him to stop. She asks what he's doing, and he tells her that he always has a pickle before the show and can't open the jar. Zora opens the jar without difficulty, horrifying Grady. However, the episode "Miss Piggy" would be the first and only episode to feature backstage scenes where Grady, Zora, and a couple other cast members visit Miss Piggy in her dressing room.

Each episode is typically written by two writers (whereas opening segments and sketches in a traditional sketch comedy series are written by a team of up to twelve writers).

Cast

Main

Except for Demi Lovato, the main cast of So Random! is identical to that of its parent series, Sonny with a Chance. 
 Tiffany Thornton as Tawni Hart
 Sterling Knight as Chad Dylan Cooper
 Brandon Mychal Smith as Nico Harris
 Doug Brochu as Grady Mitchell
 Allisyn Ashley Arm as Zora Lancaster

Recurring

 Matthew Scott Montgomery as Matthew Bailey
 Shayne Topp as Shayne Zabo
 Damien Haas as Damien Johanssen 
 Grace Bannon as Grace Wetzel
 Bridget Shergalis as Bridget Cook
 Audrey Whitby as Audrey Vale

Guest stars and artists

Performers
 Cody Simpson, performing "All Day"
 Greyson Chance, performing "Waiting Outside the Lines"
 Selena Gomez & the Scene, performing "Who Says"
 Mitchel Musso, performing "Get Away", and participating in a sketch
 Jacob Latimore, performing "Like 'Em All"
 Mindless Behavior, performing "My Girl"
 Colbie Caillat, performing "Brighter Than the Sun"
 Kicking Daisies, performing "Keeping Secrets"
 Dave Days, performing "What Does it Take"
 Far East Movement and Miguel, performing "Rocketeer", and participating in a sketch
 Hot Chelle Rae, performing "Tonight Tonight"
 Iyaz and Mann, performing "Pretty Girls"
 Lemonade Mouth, performing "Determinate" (with Bridgit Mendler and Adam Hicks also participating in sketches)
 Pia Toscano, performing "This Time"
 Justin Bieber, performing "Mistletoe"
 Christina Grimmie, performing "Advice"
 Andy Grammer, performing "Keep Your Head Up"
 The Ready Set, performing "Young Forever"
 China Anne McClain, performing "Unstoppable", and participating in sketches
 New Boyz, performing "Meet My Mom"
 Shane Harper, performing "One Step Closer"
 Destinee & Paris performing, "True Love"
 Coco Jones performing "Stand Up" and participating in sketches

Participators in sketches
 Tony Hawk
 Eric Jacobson performing Miss Piggy
 Chelsea Kane
 Leigh-Allyn Baker and Mia Talerico
 Dylan and Cole Sprouse and Debby Ryan

Episodes

Recurring sketches
 Angus: Supermodel from Down Under – An Australian Shin Model who gets into people's personal spaces.
 Braggy Benson – A segment about a kid who brags about something bad happening to him.
 Chilly Slab Ice Cream Shop – Chilly Slab Ice-Cream Shop is the ice cream shop that celebrates whenever a customer leaves a tip.
 Crazy Carson's Lost and Found – A student called Crazy Carson makes advertisements about everything being free at the lost and found.
 Dr. Goldstein – A segment about a dentist.
 Harry Potter in the Real World – After saving the world many times (but it also states that it's because they ran out of movies), Harry Potter takes on the challenges of the Real World by trying to get a job and pulling off magic spells that don't work.
 M.C. Grammar – A rapper who rhymes grammatically corrects people while he raps while he is chased by two gang members. He is a spoof of MC Hammer.
 Nolan – A French-speaking hand who gives advice.
 Puppy Playdate – Two dimwitted girls named Victoria and Lyla go on a playdate with their dogs with conversations between them end up insulting other people.
 Rufus: Kid with Excuses – A boy named Rufus tends to come up with different excuses to evade getting into trouble much to the chagrin of Principal Zaniya and Teacher Joanne. Some of these excuses end up being true.
 Raised by Beavers – A buck-toothed girl named Becky was raised by Beavers and tries to hide the fact from anyone she meets.
 Sally Jensen: Kid Lawyer – A lawyer named Sally Jensen helps a different child when it comes to whatever wrongful act someone has done to them, with said someone being locked up in jail.
 Simple Country Boy – A country boy with no background story happens to know how to handle any type of situation.
 Possibly Sarcastic Skip – A boy who's misunderstood by people by his sarcasm.
 So Random's Inappropriate Places for a Flash Mob – This segment shows the inappropriate places for people to start a Flash Mob.
 So Random! Storybook Remix – A segment detailing remixed versions of classic stories.
 Tantrum Girl – A girl named Tantrum Girl tends to lose her temper at specific things when talking about something else.
 Tales from the FBI: Fairytale Bureau Investigation - Once upon many times, there can arise a situation, that requires a visit from the Fairytale Bureau of Investigation.
 Teachers, Don't Try to Be Cool – A teacher named Mr. Goodman tries to fit in with his students and acts as if he doesn't play by the rules. This usually gets him hurt though.
 Teen Rage – Three teenagers created a band called Teen Rage against Parents and Teachers.
 The Anime Brothers – Scott and Elliot Kravitz (both dressed as parodies of Goku and Naruto Uzumaki) and are obsessed with Anime cartoons and act as if they are in the cartoons.
 The Back Up Singers – A nerdy girl named Janice has two back-up singers who help her get through life upon her mother hiring them for a Back To School present. The Back up Singers used to work for J. Lo.
 The Biggest Loser Ruins Your Meal - Two trainers from The Biggest Loser runs and ruins your meal.
 The I'm Going To Marry Zach Feldman Show – Julia Peters is an insane girl who runs a web show about Zach Feldman who she is obsessed with, much to his chagrin.
 The Platowski Brothers – Two singers named Dwayne and Calvin Platowski sing about sibling rivalry and how much they hate each other.
 The Real Princesses of New Jersey – Three princesses who are stuck-up and from New Jersey re-live fairy tales in modern day.
 The Coolest Kid in School – The Coolest Kid in School spoofs The Most Interesting Man in the World commercials.
 The Sparrow Family – This sketch details with a family of sparrows with one of them being a sparrow version of Jack Sparrow.
 Volde-Mart – This segment deals with a store that is owned by Lord Voldemort.
 Wheel Of Fortune – Pat Sajak tries to host special edition versions of Wheel Of Fortune, but the guests never get through the round because they are too distracted.
 Zombie Man – Andy is friends with a zombie named Zombie Man who tends to eat those close to him, much to his chagrin.

Broadcast
The series premiered on Disney Channel on June 5, 2011 and on Family Channel on June 10, 2011. It premiered on July 27, 2011 on Disney Channel (Australia and New Zealand) and on October 31, 2011 on Disney Channel (UK and Ireland).

Video on demand
The series became available to stream on Disney+ on April 3, 2020, however it was listed as "season 3" of Sonny with a Chance, instead of as a separate series. On July 14 of the following year, both series were separated on the platform.

Critical reception
The series's premiere earned mixed reviews. Emily Ashby of Common Sense Media gave the series four out of five stars, writing, "Sonny spin-off offers family-friendly sketch comedy, an excellent choice for families".

Music
 So Random! – Brandon Mychal Smith
 "Socks with Sandals" by Footy Scent featuring Hush Puppy – Doug Brochu featuring Brandon Mychal Smith
 "Schooled by Grammar" by MC Grammar – Brandon Mychal Smith featuring Tiffany Thornton, Shayne Topp and Sterling Knight
 "Bracey Girrlz Rap" by Bracey Girrlz – Allisyn Ashley Arm and Grace Bannon featuring Brandon Mychal Smith and Damien Haas with a voice by Audrey Whitby
 "Ketchup on Everything" by Tomatow Sue and the Posse – Allisyn Ashley Arm featuring Brandon Mychal Smith and Doug Brochu
 "Candy Pants" by Footy Scent featuring Hush Puppy – Doug Brochu featuring Brandon Mychal Smith
 "The Gift of Grammar" by MC Grammar feat. Typo and Dr. Dreidel – Brandon Mychal Smith feat. Shayne Topp, Sterling Knight, Tiffany Thornton and Allisyn Ashley Arm
 "Do the Angus" by Angus feat. Gila – Matthew Scott Montgomery feat. Tiffany Thornton
 "I'm Your Jamtron" by Jamtron – Damien Haas

References

External links
 
 
 

Sonny with a Chance
2010s American sketch comedy television series
2010s American variety television series
2011 American television series debuts
2012 American television series endings
American television spin-offs
Children's sketch comedy
Disney Channel original programming
English-language television shows
Television series about television
Television series by It's a Laugh Productions
Television series created by Steve Marmel
Television shows set in Los Angeles